Daniela Yvonne Holmqvist (born 3 May 1988) is a Swedish professional golfer. She was in contention at the 2020 Women's British Open, holding the lead as the only player to finish under-par after 36 holes.

Personal life
Holmqvist was born in Switzerland to Yvonne and Hans Holmqvist, a Swedish professional footballer with 27 appearances for the national team, who played for Young Boys in Bern at the time.

Career

After finishing high school in Stockholm she moved to the United States and played college golf at Tulane University for a year before transferring to University of California, Berkeley and the California Golden Bears. At Tulane University, she was awarded Conference USA Freshman of the year. She also won the Conference USA championship, individually by a record of 10 strokes. At Cal, she was awarded Pac-12 player of the month, as well as All-Pac-12, and All-American honors.

Holmqvist was the highest ranked Swedish amateur, member of the 2011 and 2012 Swedish National Team and winner of 2011 European Ladies' Team Championship where she had a perfect 3–0 record.

Playing on the Ladies European Tour 2013–2014, Holmqvist first received international headlines in 2013 when what tournament officials believe was a redback spider, relative of the famed black widow, nipped her leg during a qualification round for the Women's Australian Open at Royal Canberra Golf Club. Holmqvist swatted the spider away, used a golf tee to pierce her skin and squeeze out the venom, and finished her round. In 2014, she won her first professional tournament, the Mount Broughton Classic in New South Wales, Australia.

She secured her 2016 LPGA Tour membership by finishing fifth on the 2015 Symetra Tour money list after winning the Island Resort Championship and recording five other top-10 finishes, including runner-up at the Sioux Falls Great LIFE Challenge.

In 2018 she finished a career-best 75th on the LPGA Official Money List, but was sidelined for most of the 2019 season due to a back injury. Holmqvist returned to form for the 2020 Women's British Open, where she held a one-shot lead heading into the weekend, as the only player to finish under-par after 36 holes.

Amateur wins 
2009 Conference USA championship, Conference USA individual champion
2012 Pac-12 Championship, Avenue Spring Break Classic
Source:

Professional wins (3)

Symetra Tour (1)
2015 Island Resort Championship

ALPG Tour (1)
2014 Mount Broughton Classic

Swedish Golf Tour (1)
2009 VW Söderberg Ladies Masters (as an amateur)

Results in LPGA majors
Results not in chronological order before 2019.

CUT = missed the half-way cut
WD = withdrew
NT = no tournament
T = tied

Team appearances
Amateur
European Ladies' Team Championship (representing Sweden): 2011 (winners)
Espirito Santo Trophy (representing Sweden): 2012

References

External links

Swedish female golfers
Tulane Green Wave women's golfers
California Golden Bears women's golfers
LPGA Tour golfers
Golfers from Stockholm
People from Jupiter, Florida
1988 births
Living people
21st-century Swedish women